= Roscoe C. Vaught =

American football coach

Coaching career (HC unless noted)
- 1927: Kentucky State

Head coaching record
- Overall: 0–2

Roscoe C. Vaught was an American coach. He was the fourth head football coach at Kentucky State University in Frankfort, Kentucky and he held that position for the 1927 season. His career coaching record at Kentucky State was 0–2.
